Euprepiophis perlaceus,  also known as Sichuan rat snake or pearl-banded rat snake, is a species of snake in the family Colubridae snake. It is endemic to western Sichuan Province in China. This snake is designated as Endangered by the IUCN Red List. It is found in the Palearctic.

It is one of three species of Asian rat snakes which were formerly assigned to the genus Elaphe. They were separated from Elaphe in 2002 by Utiger et al. following evidence from DNA analysis. It is a true rat snake but it is not as closely related to other northern-hemisphere rat snakes as its former place in Elaphe would suggest.

References 

Colubrids
Snakes of China
Endemic fauna of Sichuan
Taxa named by Leonhard Stejneger
Reptiles described in 1929
Taxobox binomials not recognized by IUCN 
Endangered Fauna of China